The Drouin Football and Netball Club, nicknamed the Hawks, is an Australian rules football and netball club based in the city of the same name in the state of Victoria.

The club teams currently compete in the Gippsland League, fielding Senior, Reserve, Under 18 and Under 16 football teams, as well as A, B, C Grade and Under 17, Under 15 and Under 13 netball teams.

References

Australian rules football clubs in Victoria (Australia)
Australian rules football clubs established in 1890
1890 establishments in Australia
Gippsland Football League
Netball teams in Victoria (Australia)
Sports clubs established in 1890